The Buckingham School (also known as the Twelve Mile Stream or Orange Creek or Orange River School) is a historic schoolhouse in Buckingham, Florida. It is located at Buckingham and Cemetery Roads. It was added to the U.S. National Register of Historic Places on 17 February 1989.

References

External links

 Lee County listings at National Register of Historic Places
 Buckingham School

National Register of Historic Places in Lee County, Florida
Defunct schools in Florida
Schoolhouses in the United States